Tubeufia pezizula is a plant pathogen infecting sweetgums.

External links 
 Index Fungorum
 USDA ARS Fungal Database

Fungal tree pathogens and diseases
Tubeufiaceae